Maurice John Hearn (5 December 1912 – 6 December 2004) was an Australian rules footballer who played with South Melbourne and Fitzroy in the Victorian Football League (VFL).

A follower, Hearn started his career at South Melbourne but due to the team's success over three seasons he only managed 8 games. As a result, he moved to Fitzroy during the 1934 season and remained with the club for a decade. A knee injury the week prior to playing in the 1939 State of Origin, saw him take two years off. He worked in the merchant navy, travelling to Europe throughout the war. Returning from sea in 1941, he was approached by all teams apart from Collingwood. He returned to Fitzroy where he captained the club for the 1942 season and retired in 1944, his last game being Fitzroy's Grand Final win over Richmond. In 1945 he left to captain-coach Williamstown, and he led the club to the VFA premiership in 1945.

References

Maurie Hearn's obituary

External links

1912 births
2004 deaths
Australian rules footballers from Melbourne
Fitzroy Football Club players
Fitzroy Football Club Premiership players
Sydney Swans players
Williamstown Football Club players
Williamstown Football Club coaches
One-time VFL/AFL Premiership players
People from South Melbourne